Scabby Creek is a stream in the U.S. state of South Dakota.

Scabby Creek received its name from an incident when Sioux Indians kept ponies inflicted with a skin disease.

See also
List of rivers of South Dakota

References

Rivers of Todd County, South Dakota
Rivers of South Dakota